Lerryn William Mutton,  (12 October 1924 – 26 July 2015) was an Australian politician. He was the Liberal member for Yaralla in the New South Wales Legislative Assembly from 1968 to 1978.

Mutton was born in Concord, the son of Brice Mutton (member for Concord in 1949) and Lilian Taylor. He was educated at North Strathfield Public School and Fort Street Boys High School before working in his father's building business. He served in the RAAF from 1942 to 1946, seeing action as a pilot in Labuan and Borneo. He married Mavis Tucker on 29 October 1949, with whom he had four children. In 1953 he was elected to Concord Council, serving until 1968 (as Mayor from 1961 to 1962). He was also active in the local Liberal Party.

In 1968, Mutton was selected as the Liberal candidate for the new seat of Yaralla; he defeated the sitting Labor member for the abolished seat of Concord, Thomas Murphy. He held the seat until 1978, when he was defeated by Labor candidate Garry McIlwaine.

He was awarded the Medal of the Order of Australia on 14 June 2010.

References

 

1924 births
2015 deaths
Liberal Party of Australia members of the Parliament of New South Wales
Members of the New South Wales Legislative Assembly
Mayors of places in New South Wales
Recipients of the Medal of the Order of Australia
Royal Australian Air Force officers
Australian World War II pilots
Royal Australian Air Force personnel of World War II
Australian people of Cornish descent